Irish low-cost carrier Ryanair serves the following 229 year-round and seasonal destinations in 37 countries as of April 2022.

Map 

Map showing all destinations served by Ryanair as of November 2021.

List

Top airports by destinations

References

Lists of airline destinations